Roger Til (January 5, 1909 – June 28, 2002) was a French-American film and television actor. He played "Devillaine" in the miniseries The French Atlantic Affair. He also appeared in numerous film and television programs, mostly as a Maitre d' and Waiter.

Born in Paris, France. He guest-starred in numerous television programs including The Andy Griffith Show, Gomer Pyle, U.S.M.C., Laverne & Shirley, Mission: Impossible, The Bold and the Beautiful, Silver Spoons, The Facts of Life, Trapper John, M.D., The Rockford Files, Quincy, M.E., The Many Loves of Dobie Gillis, 77 Sunset Strip, The Man from U.N.C.L.E., Bosom Buddies, The Donna Reed Show, Fantasy Island and WKRP in Cincinnati. Til died in June 2002 in Los Angeles, California, at the age of 93.

Filmography

Film

Television

References

External links 

Rotten Tomatoes profile

1909 births
2002 deaths
Male actors from Paris
American male film actors
American male television actors
French male film actors
French male television actors
French emigrants to the United States
20th-century American male actors
20th-century French male actors